Michaël Eveno, better known by his stage name Grems (born 25 October 1978), is a French rapper and producer of French hip hop and designer.

He made his debut in the group Hustla alongside Le Jouage (of the band Gravité Zéro) and Dj Steady.

Discography

Solo albums

2004: Algèbre (De Brazza Records)
2006: Airmax (Deephop)
2009: Sea, Sex And Grems (Deephop)
2010: Brokabilly (Grems Industry)
2011: Algèbre 2.0
2013: Vampire
2014: Buffy
2016: Green Pisse
2018: Sans Titre #7

Hustla 

 2001: Paris-Bordeaux-Vitry
 2002: Sonophrologie
 2015: Ascenseur Émotionnel

Olympe Mountain 

 2005: La Montagne Ça Vous Gagne

Rouge à Lèvres 

 2005: Maquille-Toi
 2008: Démaquille-Toi

PMPDJ 

 2011: Pour Ma Paire De Jordan
 2012: Haterville

Klub Sandwich 

 2011: Les Valcheuzes

Mixtape 

 2012: 1978-5713

Singles 

 2002: Microbe
 2004: Merdeuse
 2004: Fonkyclapin''' feat. Booba Boobsa
 2005: Le Masque Et La Plume feat. Olympe Mountain
 2005: Reste Beatum feat. Rouge à Lèvres
 2005: Ouai Ouai feat. Rouge à Lèvres
 2006: Pisse De Flûte feat. Sept & Le Jouage
 2006: Rakaille Numerik 2006: Airmax 2007: J'te Baise feat. Gero
 2007: Gash feat. Disiz La Peste & Orifice Vulgatron
 2007: Casse Ton Boule 2008: Deepkho feat. Rouge à Lèvres
 2008: Hit That G@sh (Primecuts Re-Rub)
 2009: Guedin feat. NT4
 2009: Sec Ma Gueule feat. Set&Match
 2009: Dimanche 2010: Rencontre Avec Un Ballon 2010: Bisou 2010: Guacha feat. Micro Coz, Son Of Kick, Disiz & Natalia Clavier
 2010: Miki 2010: Broka Billy feat. Foreign Beggars
 2010: Boloss feat. Ill
 2011: My Name Is Michael Barbu 2011: Joli Village feat. Klub Sandwich
 2011: Voodoo feat. Kussay, Bunk & Greg Frite
 2011: Usla feat. PMPDJ
 2011: A Nous Les Manettes feat. Djunz, Kussay & Nemir
 2011: Hummer feat. Didaï & Rimcash
 2011: Les Vrais feat. Nekfeu
 2011: Klub Sandwich feat. Klub Sandwich
 2011: Toast'' feat. Starlion

References

External links 
 
 Grems, graffiti

1978 births
French rappers
Living people
French graphic designers